Anna Vasilyevna Gurova (born April 29, 1981) is a Russian sprint athlete. She came sixth in the 100 metres at the 2010 European Athletics Championships

She received a two-year ban from the sport from August 2011 to 2013 after she tested positive for Methyltestosterone.

International competitions

See also
List of doping cases in athletics

References

1981 births
Living people
Russian female sprinters
Russian Athletics Championships winners
Russian sportspeople in doping cases
Doping cases in athletics
21st-century Russian women